Andy Andrews (born January 1, 1959) is a former professional tennis player from the United States. He was born in Raleigh, North Carolina.

Andrews enjoyed most of his tennis success while playing doubles.  During his career he won 3 doubles titles and finished runner-up at the 1982 Australian Open partnering John Sadri.  He achieved a career-high doubles ranking of world No. 32 in February 1983.

Andrews career high singles ranking was world No. 78, which he reached in June 1982.  He was a two-time All-American at North Carolina State University and was a two-time Atlantic Coast Conference doubles champion, partnering McDonald.

Grand Prix, WCT, and Grand Slam finals

Doubles (3 titles, 3 runner-ups)

External links
 
 

1959 births
Living people
American male tennis players
NC State Wolfpack men's tennis players
Sportspeople from Raleigh, North Carolina
Tennis people from North Carolina